The Dumbartonshire Cup was the championship trophy of the Dumbartonshire FA from its inception in 1884 until the organization disbanded in 1938. There was however an 'extra' playing of the competition in 1939, immediately after the outbreak of the Second World War, prior to the 'emergency' football leagues commencing.

At its height in the 1880s, the competition was only second in importance to the Scottish Cup because three of the top teams of the time - Dumbarton, Renton and Vale of Leven - took part.

History

Key

Results

References 

Dumbarton F.C.
Defunct football cup competitions in Scotland
Football in West Dunbartonshire
Clydebank F.C. (1914)
Renton F.C.
Vale of Leven F.C.